Houston is an unincorporated community in Wayne County, Tennessee.

Geography
Houston, Tennessee is located southwest of Waynesboro. There are numerous creeks and branches in Houston which include:  Indian Creek, Rayburn Creek, Davis Branch, and many more small streams. This area consists of timberland, hills, and pastureland. There are no major highways in this community.  The only roads consists of county roads.

History
At one time Houston was the size of a small town with stores, a post office, and a school.

Economy
The economy of Houston is mainly agricultural, with main crops of corn and soybean.

Nearby cities & communities
Waynesboro
Clifton
Collinwood
Lutts
Martin's Mills
Olive Hill

References

External links
 Picture of the old Houston School House

Unincorporated communities in Tennessee
Unincorporated communities in Wayne County, Tennessee